Dorcadion moreanum is a species of beetle in the family Cerambycidae. It was described by Pic in 1907.

References

moreanum
Beetles described in 1907